All is a compilation album by the punk rock band All. It was released on February 23, 1999, on All's own label, Owned & Operated.

The album includes remastered songs picked by the fans, a previously unavailable track by Milo Aukerman, and an extensive booklet with lyrics, photos, and a complex family tree of All and the Descendents.

Since this album was self-released, a limited number of copies were pressed. Because of this, it is harder to find on the secondary market than other All CDs.

Track listing

Credits
Bill Stevenson – Drums
Karl Alvarez – Bass, vocals
Stephen Egerton – Guitar
Chad Price – Vocals on tracks 2, 5, 8, 10, 14, 18 and 20
Scott Reynolds – Vocals on tracks 1, 4, 6, 9, 11, 13, 15, 17, 19 and 22
Dave Smalley – Vocals on tracks 3, 7, 12 and 21
Milo Aukerman – Vocals on track 16

References

1999 greatest hits albums
All (band) albums
Owned & Operated albums
Self-released albums
Albums produced by Bill Stevenson (musician)